St. John's Church in Savannah is a parish of the Episcopal Diocese of Georgia.

The church was formed in 1841 from the growing Christ Church, Savannah, as part of a plan to increase Episcopal presence in Georgia and to provide for a first bishop of the diocese. One of its founders was local businessman Edward Padelford. After his death in 1870, his name was added to one of the church's stained-glass windows. Eleven other windows are also dedicated to notable early members of the church.

In addition to his Episcopal duties, the bishop would be rector of both St. John's and Christ Church. Stephen Elliott, Jr. was consecrated as Bishop of Georgia in February 1841.

St. John's first building was consecrated in 1843. When the congregation outgrew this building, the construction was undertaken of the current building (which is situated in Madison Square, across from the historic Green-Meldrim House, now the church's parish house). The building was designed by Calvin N. Otis of Buffalo, New York, and was consecrated in May 1853.

The Parish continues to use the 1928 Book of Common Prayer, as the basis for worship. St. John's maintains a cordial relationship with the Episcopal Diocese of Georgia, although the character of the congregation is more traditional than most of the parishes in The Episcopal Church (TEC).

It is included in the Savannah Historic District.

Rectors

References

Further reading
Linton Weeks. St. John's Church in Savannah. 1985.

External links
Official website
The Episcopal Diocese of Georgia
The Prayer Book Society

Landmarks in Savannah, Georgia
Book of Common Prayer
Episcopal church buildings in Georgia (U.S. state)
Churches in Savannah, Georgia
Churches completed in 1853
Religious organizations established in 1841
1841 establishments in Georgia (U.S. state)
Madison Square (Savannah) buildings
Savannah Historic District